A precision-guided munition (PGM, smart weapon, smart munition, smart bomb) is a guided munition intended to precisely hit a specific target, to minimize collateral damage and increase lethality against intended targets. During the First Gulf War guided munitions accounted for only 9% of weapons fired, but accounted for 75% of all successful hits. Despite guided weapons generally being used on more difficult targets, they were still 35 times more likely to destroy their targets per weapon dropped.

Because the damage effects of explosive weapons decrease with distance due to an inverse cube law, even modest improvements in accuracy (hence reduction in miss distance) enable a target to be attacked with fewer or smaller bombs. Thus, even if some guided bombs miss, fewer air crews are put at risk and the harm to civilians and the amount of collateral damage may be reduced.

The advent of precision-guided munitions resulted in the renaming of older, low-technology bombs as "unguided bombs", "dumb bombs", or "iron bombs".

Types

Recognizing the difficulty of hitting moving ships during the Spanish Civil War, the Germans were first to develop steerable munitions, using radio control or wire guidance. The U.S. tested TV-guided (GB-4), semi-active radar-guided (Bat), and infrared-guided (Felix) weapons.

Inertial-guided weapons
The CBU-107 Passive Attack Weapon is an air-dropped guided bomb containing metal penetrator rods of various sizes. It was designed to attack targets where an explosive effect may be undesirable, such as fuel storage tanks or chemical weapon stockpiles in civilian areas.

Radio-controlled weapons

The Germans were first to introduce PGMs in combat, with KG 100 deploying the  MCLOS-guidance Fritz X armored glide bomb, guided by the Kehl-Straßburg radio guidance system, to successfully attack the Italian battleship Roma in 1943, and the similarly Kehl-Straßburg MCLOS-guided Henschel Hs 293 rocket-boosted glide bomb (also in use since 1943, but only against lightly armored or unarmored ship targets).

The closest Allied equivalents, both unpowered designs, were the  VB-1 AZON (from "AZimuth ONly" control), used in both Europe and the CBI theater, and the US Navy's Bat, primarily used in the Pacific Theater of World War II — the Navy's Bat was more advanced than either German PGM ordnance design or the USAAF's VB-1 AZON, in that it had its own on board, autonomous radar seeker system to direct it to a target. In addition, the U.S. tested the rocket-propelled Gargoyle, which never entered service. Japanese PGMs—with the exception of the anti-ship air-launched, rocket-powered, human-piloted Yokosuka MXY-7 Ohka, "Kamikaze" flying bomb did not see combat in World War II.

Prior to the war, the British experimented with radio-controlled remotely guided planes laden with explosives, such as Larynx. The United States Army Air Forces used similar techniques with Operation Aphrodite, but had few successes; the German Mistel (Mistletoe) "parasite aircraft" was no more effective, guided by the human pilot flying the single-engined fighter mounted above the unmanned, explosive-laden twin-engined "flying bomb" below it, released in the Mistel's attack dive from the fighter.

The U.S. programs restarted in the Korean War. In the 1960s, the electro-optical bomb (or camera bomb) was reintroduced. They were equipped with television cameras and flare sights, by which the bomb would be steered until the flare superimposed the target. The camera bombs transmitted a "bomb's eye view" of the target back to a controlling aircraft. An operator in this aircraft then transmitted control signals to steerable fins fitted to the bomb. Such weapons were used increasingly by the USAF in the last few years of the Vietnam War because the political climate was increasingly intolerant of civilian casualties, and because it was possible to strike difficult targets (such as bridges) effectively with a single mission; the Thanh Hoa Bridge, for instance, was attacked repeatedly with iron bombs, to no effect, only to be dropped in one mission with PGMs.

Although not as popular as the newer JDAM and JSOW weapons, or even the older laser-guided bomb systems, weapons like the AGM-62 Walleye TV guided  bomb are still being used, in conjunction with the AAW-144 Data Link Pod, on US Navy F/A-18 Hornets.

Infrared-guided/electro-optical weapons

In World War II, the U.S. National Defense Research Committee developed the VB-6 Felix, which used infrared to home on ships. While it entered production in 1945, it was never employed operationally. The first successful electro optical guided munition was the AGM-62 Walleye during the Vietnam war. It was a family of large glide bombs which could automatically track targets using contrast differences in the video feed. The original concept was created by engineer Norman Kay while tinkering with televisions as a hobby. It was based on a device which could track objects on a television screen and place a "blip" on them to indicate where it was aiming. The first test of the weapon on 29 January 1963 was a success, with the weapon making a direct hit on the target. It served successfully for three decades until the 1990s.

The Raytheon Maverick is the most common electro optical guided missile. As a heavy anti-tank missile it has among its various marks guidance systems such as electro-optical (AGM-65A), imaging infrared (AGM-65D), and laser homing (AGM-65E). The first two, by guiding themselves based on the visual or IR scene of the target, are fire-and-forget in that the pilot can release the weapon and it will guide itself to the target without further input, which allows the delivery aircraft to manoeuvre to escape return fire. The Pakistani NESCOM H-2 MUPSOW and H-4 MUPSOW is an electro-optical (IR imaging and television guided) is a drop and forget precision-guided glide bomb. The Israeli Elbit Opher is also an IR imaging "drop and forget" guided bomb that has been reported to be considerably cheaper than laser-homing bombs and can be used by any aircraft, not requiring specialized wiring for a laser designator or for another aircraft to illuminate the target. During NATO's air campaign in 1999 in Kosovo the new Italian AF AMX employed the Opher.

Laser-guided weapons

In 1962, the US Army began research into laser guidance systems and by 1967 the USAF had conducted a competitive evaluation leading to full development of the world's first laser-guided bomb, the BOLT-117, in 1968. All such bombs work in much the same way, relying on the target being illuminated, or "painted," by a laser target designator on the ground or on an aircraft. They have the significant disadvantage of not being usable in poor weather where the target illumination cannot be seen, or where a target designator cannot get near the target. The laser designator sends its beam in a coded series of pulses so the bomb cannot be confused by an ordinary laser, and also so multiple designators can operate in reasonable proximity.

Originally the project began as a surface to air missile seeker developed by Texas Instruments. When TI executive Glenn E. Penisten attempted to sell the new technology to the Air Force they inquired if it could instead be used as a ground attack system to overcome problems they were having with accuracy of bombing in Vietnam. The system was sent to Vietnam and performed well. Without the existence of tracking pods they had to be aimed using a hand held laser from the back seat of an F-4 Phantom, but still performed well. Eventually over 28,000 were dropped during the war.

Laser-guided weapons did not become commonplace until the advent of the microchip.  They made their practical debut in Vietnam, where on 13 May 1972 they were used in the second successful attack on the Thanh Hóa Bridge ("Dragon's Jaw").  This structure had previously been the target of 800 American sorties (using unguided weapons) and was partially destroyed in each of two successful attacks, the other being on 27 April 1972 using Walleyes.

They were used, though not on a large scale, by the British forces during the 1982 Falklands War. The first large-scale use of smart weapons came in the early 1990s during Operation Desert Storm when they were used by coalition forces against Iraq. Even so, most of the air-dropped ordnance used in that war was "dumb," although the percentages are biased by the large use of various (unguided) cluster bombs. Laser-guided weapons were used in large numbers during the 1999 Kosovo War, but their effectiveness was often reduced by the poor weather conditions prevalent in the southern Balkans.

There are two basic families of laser-guided bombs in American (and American-sphere) service: the Paveway II and the Paveway III. The Paveway III guidance system is more aerodynamically efficient and so has a longer range, however it is more expensive. Paveway II  LGBs (such as GBU-12) are a cheaper lightweight PGM suitable for use against vehicles and other small targets, while a Paveway III  penetrator (such as GBU-24) is a more expensive weapon suitable for use against high-value targets. GBU-12s were used to great effect in the first Gulf War, dropped from F-111F aircraft to destroy Iraqi armored vehicles in a process informally referred to by pilots as "tank plinking."

AGM-123 Skipper II is a short-range laser-guided missile developed by the United States Navy. The Skipper was intended as an anti-ship weapon, capable of disabling the largest vessels with a  impact-fuzed warhead. 
It is composed of a Mark 83 bomb fitted with a Paveway guidance kit and two Mk 78 solid propellant rockets that fire upon launch.

Sudarshan is an Indian laser-guided bomb kit, developed by Aeronautical Development Establishment (ADE), a DRDO lab with technological support from another DRDO lab Instruments Research and Development Establishment (IRDE), for the Indian Air Force (IAF).

KAB-1500L and KAB-500L are Russian laser-guided bombs.

LT PGB is a family of Chinese laser-guided munitions.

LS PGB is a family of Chinese GPS+INS or laser guided munitions.

The Advanced Precision Kill Weapon System (APKWS) also known as Laser, infrared Guided Rocket (LiGR) is a design conversion of Hydra 70 unguided rockets with a laser guidance kit to turn them into precision-guided munitions (PGMs).

Ugroza (meaning "menace") is a precision-guided weapons system made in Russian Federation. It is an upgrade for standard Russian "dumb" rockets, including the S-5, S-8, and S-13 rockets. The system upgrades the "dumb" rockets with laser guidance, very significantly increasing their accuracy. It requires a laser target designator, from either an airborne or land based source, to "paint" a target. Ugroza allows rockets to be ripple-fired up to 7 at a time.
The notable novelty is that the system does not use aerodynamic flight control (e.g. tail fins), but impulse steering with mini-thrusters. It has been dubbed as the Russian concept of impulse corrections (RCIC).

The Roketsan Cirit is a Turkish laser guided missile.
Cirit is a  guided missile system fitted with a semi-active laser homing seeker. The seeker and guidance section is attached to a purpose-built warhead with a Class 5 Insensitive Munition (IM). The multipurpose warhead has a combined armour-piercing ammunition with enhanced behind armor anti-personnel and incendiary effects. The engine is of reduced smoke design, with IM properties. It is connected to the rear section by a roll bearing that enables it to rotate in flight. There are four small stabilising surfaces at the very rear of the missile in front of the exhaust nozzle that ensures stable flight. Roketsan has developed a new launch pod and a new canister in which Cirit is delivered as an all-up round.

Radar-guided weapons

The Lockheed-Martin Hellfire II light-weight anti-tank weapon in one mark uses the radar on the Boeing AH-64D Apache Longbow to provide fire-and-forget guidance for that weapon.

Satellite-guided weapons

Lessons learned during the first Gulf War showed the value of precision munitions, yet they also highlighted the difficulties in employing them—specifically when visibility of the ground or target from the air was degraded. The problem of poor visibility does not affect satellite-guided weapons such as Joint Direct Attack Munition (JDAM) and Joint Stand-Off Weapon (JSOW), which make use of the United States' GPS system for guidance. This weapon can be employed in all weather conditions, without any need for ground support. Because it is possible to jam GPS, the guidance package reverts to inertial navigation in the event of GPS signal loss. Inertial navigation is significantly less accurate; the JDAM achieves a published Circular Error Probable (CEP) of  under GPS guidance, but typically only  under inertial guidance (with free fall times of 100 seconds or less).

The Joint Direct Attack Munition (JDAM) is a guidance kit that converts unguided bombs, or "dumb bombs", into all-weather "smart" munitions. When installed on a bomb, the JDAM kit is given a GBU (Guided Bomb Unit) nomenclature, superseding the Mark 80 or BLU (Bomb, Live Unit) nomenclature of the bomb to which it is attached.

Wind Corrected Munitions Dispenser (WCMD) is a GPS/INS-guided US tail kit for use with the TMD (Tactical Munitions Dispenser) family of cluster bombs to convert them to precision-guided munitions.

Wan chien – Taiwanese indigenous version of JDAM.

The Griffin Laser Guided Bomb (Griffin LGB) is a laser-guided bomb system made by Israel Aerospace Industries' MBT missile division. It is an add-on kit which is used to retrofit existing Mark 82, Mark 83, and Mark 84 and other "dumb fire" gravity bombs, making them into laser-guided smart bombs (with the option of GPS guidance). Initial development completed in 1990.
The Griffin conversion kit consists of a front "seeker" section and a set of steerable tailplanes. The resulting guided munition features "trajectory shaping", which allows the bomb to fall along a variety of trajectories – from a shallow angle to a vertical top attack profile. IAI publishes a circular error probable figure for the weapon of 5 metres.

The GBU-57A/B  Massive Ordnance Penetrator (MOP) is a U.S. Air Force, precision-guided,  "bunker buster" bomb. This is substantially larger than the deepest penetrating bunker busters previously available, the  GBU-28 and GBU-37.

The SMKB (Smart-MK-Bomb) is a Brazilian guidance kit that turns a standard  Mk 82 or  Mk 83 into a precision-guided weapon, respectively called SMKB-82 and SMKB-83.

FT PGB is a family  of Chinese satellite and Inertial,  guided munitions.

LS PGB is a family of Chinese GPS+INS or laser guided munitions.

The precision of these weapons is dependent both on the precision of the measurement system used for location determination and the precision in setting the coordinates of the target. The latter critically depends on intelligence information, not all of which is accurate. According to a CIA report, the accidental United States bombing of the Chinese embassy in Belgrade during Operation Allied Force by NATO aircraft was attributed to faulty target information. However, if the targeting information is accurate, satellite-guided weapons are significantly more likely to achieve a successful strike in any given weather conditions than any other type of precision-guided munition.

Advanced guidance concepts
Responding to after-action reports from pilots who employed laser or satellite guided weapons, Boeing developed a Laser JDAM (LJDAM) to provide both types of guidance in a single kit. Based on the existing Joint Direct Attack Munition configurations, a laser guidance package is added to a GPS/INS-guided weapon to increase its overall accuracy. Raytheon has developed the Enhanced Paveway family, which adds GPS/INS guidance to their Paveway family of laser-guidance packages. These "hybrid" laser and GPS guided weapons permit the carriage of fewer weapons types, while retaining mission flexibility, because these weapons can be employed equally against moving and fixed targets, or targets of opportunity. For instance, a typical weapons load on an F-16 flying in the Iraq War included a single  JDAM and two  LGBs. With LJDAM, and the new GBU-39 Small Diameter Bomb (SDB), these same aircraft can carry more bombs if necessary, and have the option of satellite or laser guidance for each weapon release.

Spice (munition)  is an Israeli EO/GPS-guided guidance kit for converting air-droppable unguided bombs into precision guided bombs. Spice can be preprogrammed, with up to 100 different targets it may have to engage during a mission. The one target it will actually engage may then be selected, inflight, by an aircrewman.

The HGK guidance kit (HGK)), developed by TÜBİTAK-SAGE, is a GPS/INS  guidance kit that converts  Mark 84 bombs into smart weapons.

Armement Air-Sol Modulaire (AASM)  is a French equivalent to JDAM. AASM comprises a frontal guidance kit and a rear-mounted range extension kit matched to a dumb bomb. The weapon is modular because it can integrate different types of guidance units and different types of bombs. It uses hybrid inertial navigation system (INS) / Global Positioning System (GPS) guidance. Other variants add infrared homing or laser guidance to increase accuracy.

Paveway IV is a dual mode GPS/INS and laser-guided bomb manufactured by Raytheon UK (formerly Raytheon Systems Limited). It is the latest iteration of the Paveway series.

Denel Dynamics Umbani a precision-guided bomb kit manufactured by Denel Dynamics in South Africa. It consists of a number of modules fitted to NATO standard Mk81, Mk82 or Mk83 low drag free-fall bombs to convert them to glide bombs.

High Speed Low Drag Bomb (HSLD) is an Indian precision guided munition developed by Armament Research and Development Establishment that is comparable with the US' Mark 80 series. It uses inertial and satellite navigation with laser guidance kit for target accuracy.

Moving Target Artillery Round (MTAR)

The U.S. Navy leads development for a new  artillery round called Moving Target Artillery Round, capable of destroying moving targets in GPS-denied environments". The Office of Naval Research (ONR), the Naval Surface Warfare Center Dahlgren Division (NSWC Dahlgren), and the U.S. Army Research Laboratory (ARL) have been coordinating MTAR, with final development scheduled for 2019.

Key features of the MTAR shell include extended range against moving targets, precision guidance and navigation without GPS, subsystem modularity, subsystem maturity, weapon system compatibility, restricted altitude, all-weather capability, reduced time of flight, and affordability. The new munition is intended for the Army or Marine Corps M777A1 howitzer, the M109A6 Paladin, and M109A7 Paladin Integrated Management (PIM) self-propelled  artillery systems. The shell also would be for the Navy's Advanced Gun System (AGS) aboard the Zumwalt-class destroyer, and other future naval gun systems.

Precision Guidance Kit – Modernization (PGK-M)

The U.S. Army is planning for GPS-denied environments with the new Precision Guidance Kit – Modernization (PGK-M). An enhancement of previous technologies, PGK-M will give U.S. forces the ability to continue launching precision strikes when GPS is compromised by the enemy.

Picatinny Arsenal engineers are leading the development of a GPS alternative using image navigation for precision guidance of munitions, under the Armament Research, Development and Engineering Center (ARDEC). Other research partners include Draper Labs, U.S. Army Research Laboratory, Air Force Research Laboratory and the Aviation and Missile Research, Development, and Engineering Center.

The enhanced munition can navigate to a desired location, through a reference image used by the technology to reach the target. The PGK-M includes a collection of ad hoc software programmable radio networks, various kinds of wave-relay connectivity technologies and navigational technology.

PBK-500U Drel is a Russian guided jamming-resistant stealth glide bomb.

Cannon and mortar-launched guided projectiles

A cannon-launched guided projectile (CLGP), is fired from artillery, ship's cannon, or armored vehicles. Several agencies and organizations sponsored the CLGP programs. The United States Navy sponsored the Deadeye program, a laser-guided shell for its  guns and a program to mate a Paveway guidance system to an  shell for the 8"/55 caliber Mark 71 gun in the 1970s (Photo). Other Navy efforts include the BTERM, ERGM, and LRLAP shells.

The U.S. Army's MGM-51 Shillelagh missile can be considered a type of CLGP. Intended for use on the M551 Sheridan light tank, the Shillelagh missile was fired out of the Sheridan's cannon to provide robust anti-tank capability. The Army's M712 Copperhead laser guided artillery round was used in Desert Storm. Army CLGPs include the M982 Excalibur  artillery shell, the XM395 Precision Guided Mortar Munition, and the XM1156 Precision Guidance Kit to refit existing 155 mm shells with precision guidance, as the Air Force's JDAM program converts dumb bombs into precision munitions.

M982 Excalibur, GPS-guided munitions (XM982) for 155 mm artillery was developed in a collaborative effort between U.S. Army Research Laboratory (ARL) and the Armaments Research and Development Center (ARDEC). Research included developing GPS and microelectromechanical systems (MEMS) Inertial Sensor Technology. Excalibur was fielded in Operation Iraqi Freedom in the summer of 2007. Technology developed on the Excalibur is also applied in the Army's Precision Guidance Kit (PGK) for use on existing conventional projectiles and the Mortar Guidance Kit (MGK) for use on conventional mortars.

XM1111 Mid-Range Munition is cancelled  tank gun launched missile.

LAHAT is Israeli semi-active laser homing guided low-weight anti-tank guided missile that can be launched from smoothbore tank guns.

KSTAM is South Korean guided munition shot from the gun of K2 Black Panther tank.

30F39 Krasnopol is a Russian  cannon-launched, fin-stabilized, base bleed-assisted, semi-automatic laser-guided, explosive projectile. It automatically 'homes' on a point illuminated by a laser designator, typically operated by a ground-based artillery observer.

Kitolov-2M is a Russian laser-guided  artillery shell with Malakhit automated artillery fire control system.

9M119 Svir/Refleks are Russian tank gun-launched laser-guided projectiles.

Pansarsprängvinggranat m/94 STRIX is a Swedish endphase-guided projectile fired from a  mortar currently manufactured by Saab Bofors Dynamics.
STRIX is fired like a conventional mortar round. The round contains an infrared imaging sensor that it uses to guide itself onto any tank or armoured fighting vehicle in the vicinity where it lands. The seeker is designed to ignore targets that are already burning.

Basir is an Iranian artillery fired laser-guided, 155 mm explosive projectile designed to destroy enemy tanks, vehicles and other moving or non-moving targets with high precision. This weapon is similar in function with Russian Kransnopol or American M712 Copperhead.

SMArt 155 is a German 155 mm artillery round, designed for a long range, indirect fire top attack role against armoured vehicles.  The SMArt carrier shell contains two submunitions with infrared sensor and millimeter wave radar, which descend over the battlefield on ballutes and attack hardened targets with explosively formed penetrator warheads.  Built with multiple redundant self-destruct mechanisms, these submunitions were specifically designed to fall outside the category of submunition weapons prohibited by the 2008 Convention on Cluster Munitions.

SAMHO is an Indian gun-launched anti-tank guided missile developed by the Armament Research and Development Establishment (ARDE) for the Arjun MBT of the Indian Army.

Rheinmetall Denel Munitions 155 mm V-LAP

GP1: Chinese laser-guided 155 mm artillery projectile based on Krasnopol.

GP6: Chinese laser-guided 155 mm artillery projectile based on Krasnopol.

XM395 Precision Guided Mortar Munition

Strix mortar round

KM-8 Gran is a Russian guided 120 mm mortar shell with Malakhit fire control system.

GP120 (GP4) is a Chinese terminal corrected 120 mm mortar shell.

GP140 is a Chinese semi-active laser (SAL) guided 120 mm mortar shell.

Guided small arms

Precision-guided small arms prototypes have been developed which use a laser designator to guide an electronically actuated bullet to a target.  Another system in development uses a laser range finder to trigger an explosive small arms shell in proximity to a target.  The U.S. Army plans to use such devices in the future.

In 2008 the EXACTO program began under DARPA to develop a "fire and forget" smart sniper rifle system including a guided smart bullet and improved scope.  The exact technologies of this smart bullet have not been released.  EXACTO was test fired in 2014 and 2015 and results showing the bullet alter course to correct its path to its target were released.

In 2012 Sandia National Laboratories announced a self-guided bullet prototype that could track a target illuminated with a laser designator. The bullet is capable of updating its position 30 times a second and hitting targets over a mile away.

Pike is a precision-guided mini-missile fired from an underslung grenade launcher.

Air burst grenade launchers are a type of precision-guided weapons. Such grenade launchers can preprogram their grenades using a fire-control system to explode in the air above or beside the enemy.

See also
 Guidance system
 Guided bomb
 Missile guidance
 TERCOM
 Terminal guidance
 Wire-guided missile

Notes

References

External links

A Brief History of Precision Guided Weapons
How Smart Bombs Work
BBC: "Smart bombs missed Iraqi targets" — on the first employment of the JSOW, guidance failures from a software error subsequently fixed.
"Fact File: Smart Bombs – not so Smart" BBC story discussing the limitations of guided munition employment.
Janes.com: "Ukraine develops indigenous guided airborne weapons" — 2006 article about Ukrainian guided bomb development.
"World War II Glide Bombs" (Part1)
"World War II Glide Bombs" (Part2)
"World War II Glide Bombs" (Modern Glide Bombs)
"Soviet/Russian Guided Bombs"  by Air Power Australia

Aerial bombs
Targeting (warfare)